Maritime Studies is an interdisciplinary academic field that uses liberal arts or business as the foundation for exploring humankind's relationship with waterways and watersheds. Incorporating maritime history, sea literature, poetry, film, oceanography, cartography, culture studies, and contemporary marine policy, maritime studies covers a broader scope than traditional maritime history or seamanship. 

Maritime Studies "must be broad based and multidisciplinary and involve 'almost every profession having to do with the sea.'" 
Some of the institutions providing maritime studies combine a broad grounding in technical and scientific coursework with the study of courses in arts and humanities. 

While maritime academies frequently prepare cadets for careers in the merchant marine, maritime studies programs prepare students for a variety of careers in the civilian maritime industrial and service sectors.  Graduate and undergraduate programs are offered at the following institutions:

 The University of Connecticut /Avery Point Campus
 East Carolina University
 Escola de Formação de Oficiais da Marinha Mercante
 Memorial University of Newfoundland
 Texas A & M Galveston
 University of West Florida
 State University of New York Maritime College
 Norwegian University of Science and Technology
 Maritime University of Szczecin
 Nanyang Technological University
 University of Piraeus
 University of KwaZulu Natal

References 

Maritime culture
Maritime colleges
Maritime education